The Embassy of Germany in Athens is the chief diplomatic mission of Germany in Greece. It is located in Kolonaki, one of the most prestigious neighbourhoods in central Athens.

Germany also maintains a Consulate-General in Thessaloniki, as well as several honorary consuls across Greece.

History 
The Prussian legation was located at Akadimias Str. 23, today the headquarters of the Association of Foreign Press. After the establishment of the German Empire in 1871, it was converted into the German Embassy. After this building was sold, the embassy was located at Vasilissis Sofias Ave. 2 during the 1930s and the German occupation had lost the ability to act in foreign policy.

The new beginning took place in 1951, when Germany initially resumed diplomatic relations with 12 countries, including Greece. Chancellor Konrad Adenauer's first official visit to Greece took place in March 1954. After the new start, the embassy was initially temporarily housed in the Hotel Grande Bretagne, then moved to a building at Issiodou Street 22 in 1953.

In 1969, both the current building and the annex at 14 Ypsilantou Street were acquired as property. The increasing space requirement and the damage caused by the great earthquake of 1981 led to the decision to rebuild the building. A relocation of the embassy office to Maroussi (Vasilissis Sofias Str. 10) became necessary during the construction period. The completion and move into the new building took place in October 1993.

The current Embassy building is significant in its architecture for the incorporation of the Chronos Sculpture [German: Chronoskulptur], created by Karl Schlamminger, on its facade.

Ambassador's Residence 
The official residence of the German Ambassador was formerly located at Ethnikis Antistaseos Str. 52, in Chalandri. However, due to the fact that it was occasionally targeted by protests, as well as a terrorist attack in 2013, the residence was moved to a more secure location, in Filothei.

See also 

 Germany-Greece relations
 List of diplomatic missions in Greece
 List of diplomatic missions of Germany

References 

Athens
Germany
Germany–Greece relations